Regimen sanitatis Salernitanum, Latin: The Salernitan Rule of Health (commonly known as Flos medicinae or Lilium medicinae - The Flower of Medicine, The Lily of Medicine) is a medieval didactic poem in hexameter verse.  It is allegedly a work of the Schola Medica Salernitana (from which its other name Flos medicinae scholae Salerni is derived), a medieval medical school in Salerno. This school founded in the 9th century is considered possibly the oldest medical school, in a southern Italian city, which held the most important medical information, the most famous and notable being Regimen santiatis Salernitanum. Nearly 300 copies of this poem are published, in various languages, for medical professionals.

Origin 

The Regimen is believed to have been written in the 12th or 13th century, although some sources estimate this to have been as early as 1050. Belief of its origin in the 13th century is due to the popularity it gained around this time, some authorities believe the 1100 mark is accurate as well. The Regimen written in hexameter verse is a form of Greek poetry and often found in old Greek and Latin poems. Similar to iambic pentameter, the style of writing consists of Six Feet dactyls to create an epic. Even though the book bears the name of the famous medieval medical school, it is not certain if it originated there, since there is no reference to Salerno, but the school utilized it as their Code of Health. The Salerno Book of Health is credited as the linear ancestor to surviving medical texts in several aspects of medicine. Some legends claim the poem was written for the benefit of Duke of Normandy Robert Curthose, while others claim it was a gift from the Saliternitan writers to the king of England. The true author is unknown, but it is commonly attributed to John of Milan. There are also large influence from Arab writers that helped dissipate into the foundations of knowledge that the Schola Medica Salernitana used as application to health education. There is not much known about the beginnings and creation of this poem, but there are many references of all aspects of medieval society that shifted the movement of education into public health. In the School of Salerno, the poem is often referred to as the “Schola Salernitana.” This poem evolved to a norm in the world of medical education that it continued its celebrity status until the 18th century.

While medical schools were not known to be as prestigious as current day hospitals, considering the majority of rules and education previous to the 12th century was based on monasteries and their Christian teachings, this poem opened up a new form of education that physicians of all practice and backgrounds could utilize. Prior to this poem, only certain practitioners received formal training in their respected fields, and delved more into individual health and hospice, and focused primarily on superstition and folklore "magic". This does not take away from the founding of the most prestigious medical schools at this time, and with Schola Medica Salernitana recently being founded, this opened more discussion and practice on public health and education on the proper hygiene for childbirths, surgeries, and wounds. This medical school was also the first to have female students, which opens another door to realm of medicine and practitioners that would utilize the Regimen to properly perfect their practice.

Content 

This poem concerns domestic medical practice such as daily hygienic procedures and diet (e.g. it illustrates the therapeutic uses of wine). The Regimen contains multiple outlets of guidance and instruction for preservation of public and individual health. There is also mention of therapeutics. This poem is written with the focus of the public, specifically in the wordage that can be understood by lay people, rather than a focus towards medical professionals. The poem discusses dietetics, which is a branch of medicine that include environmental factors of health. The early Regimen was organized by the six non-naturals. According to Galen, they are: air, food and drink, sleeping and waking, motion and rest, excretions and retentions, and dreams and the passions of the soul. The original content addressed the Humors, the Complexions (Temperaments), and some diseases. This poem concerns domestic medical practice such as daily hygienic procedures and diet (e.g. it illustrates the therapeutic uses of wine). In medieval medicine at this time, there was also the four "humours" that were related to both the body and the four elements, those being; phelgm (water), blood (air), yellow bile (fire) and black bile (earth). The original content addressed the Humors, the Complexions (Temperaments), and some diseases. It also contained a phlebotomy, which provided information on bloodletting. The Regimen focuses on the non-natural things as measures for diseases, some of which include migraines, strokes, dizziness, and with the segment of therapeutics provides treatment based on natural remedies. The index of subjects of the Code of Health for the School of Salerno, which is derived of the poem, begins with the individual health based on sleep, portioning of foods, wine, diets, and seasoning of food to pertain to certain health benefits. The Health Code then goes into individual foods, such as fruits and fish and dairy products, and then introduces topics such as bones, teeth and veins of the body, medications, hygiene and the Regimen of months. Translations of the Code Book show that the Regimen shows unparallel value at its time of existence to the school of medicine because of its general knowledge to all aspects of individual and public health that other books or instructors did not include in their works.

Preservation in History

The original Latin version was annotated and edited by Arnold of Villanova. The Regimen was contemporary with Secretum Secretorum, a health manual written by pseudo-Aristotle. However, the Regimen was more popular because the rhyming verses were easier to remember. The Regimen was translated into vernacular languages, including Irish, Bohemian, Occitan, Hebrew, German, Anglo-Norman, and Italian. Following its first appearance in print, the Regimen was translated into almost every European language, and the book achieved tremendous popularity and nearly forty different editions were produced before 1501. An English translation by Thomas Paynell was printed by Thomas Berthelet in 1528.

The work itself came to be highly revered as a scholarly medical text and was seriously discussed until the 19th century. Various editions and versions of the Regimen circulated throughout Europe, many with commentaries that added or removed material from the original poem. During this interval, the Regimen was expanded from the original 364 lines to 3,526 hexameter verses. The first English translation was made by Sir John Harington in 1608. An attempt to make a medically  accurate translation was made in 1871 by the American doctor John Ordronaux.

Based on the hundreds of copies made about the poem, it was medical schools that kept the poem intact and preserved for hundreds of years, and the rise of digitization of past sources and books managed to keep a few of the copies intact and well as increasing the audience another time with the internet being the main source of research for this reproduction of books. Current historians believe the preservation of this poem is crucial not only to the medical community, but the cultural preservation of printed work and the overall preservation process, especially with the importance this poem gave to the medical community centuries before.

By 1224, the Holy Roman Emperor Frederick II made it required that any student wishing to practice and learn Medicine in the Naples Kingdom had to gain approval from the Salerno medical masters, which also help preserve the printed of the poem's verses, as they became a requirement to Southern Italian students and subjects.

Quotes
Why should a man die who has sage in his garden? (Latin: Cur moriatur homo, cui salvia crescit in horto?). Cf. Contra vim mortis non crescit herba in hortis.

Si tibi deficiant medici, medici tibi fiant
Haec tria: mens laeta, requies, moderata diaeta (Latin text).

Use three physicions still; first Doctor Quiet,
Next Doctor Merry-man and Doctor Dyet (Harington's translation, 1608).

If doctors fail you, let these three be doctors for you:
A joyful mind, rest, and a moderate diet. (Modern translation)

References and footnotes
Andrews, Sarah. “Regimen Sanitatis Salernitanum.” Need to Know, May 24, 2021. https://blog.lib.uiowa.edu/needtoknow/tag/regimen-sanitatis-salernitanum/.

Croke, Alexander. Regimen Sanitatis Salernitanum a Poem on the Preservation of Health in Rhyming Latin Verse. Addressed by the School of Salerno to Robert of Normandy, Son of William the Conqueror, with an Ancient Translation: And an Introduction and Notes by Sir Alexander Croke, D.C.L. and F.A.S. Oxford: D.A. Talboys, 1830.

de Divitiis E;Cappabianca P;de Divitiis O; “The ‘Schola Medica Salernitana’: The Forerunner of the Modern University Medical Schools.” Neurosurgery. U.S. National Library of Medicine. Accessed December 9, 2022. https://pubmed.ncbi.nlm.nih.gov/15458581/.

González, V. de Frutos, and A.L. Guerrero Peral. “Neurology in Medieval Regimina Sanitatis.” Neurología (English Edition). Elsevier Doyma, November 17, 2011. https://www.sciencedirect.com/science/article/pii/S2173580811000022.

Harington, John. “The School of Salernum.” Google Books. Google, 1920.

LAFAILLE, ROBERT, HENNIE HIEMSTRA, and H. Themstra. “The Regimen of Salerno, a Contemporary Analysis of a Medieval Healthy Life Style Program.” Health Promotion International 5, no. 1 (1990): 57–74. http://www.jstor.org/stable/45152005.

Ordonaux, J. Translation into English verse of Regimen Sanitatis Salerni. Scuola Medica Salernitana. Lippincott, 1871.

“Regimen Sanitatis Salernitanum. Code of Health of the School of Salernum : Ordronaux, John, 1830-1908, Tr : Free Download, Borrow, and Streaming.” Internet Archive. Philadelphia, J.B. Lippincott & co., January 1, 1870. https://archive.org/details/codehealthschoo00salegoog/page/n36/mode/2up.

Thomas, James. “Medical School Medieval Style - Mcdreeamie-Musings.” mcdreeamie. mcdreeamie-musings, February 9, 2021. https://mcdreeamiemusings.com/blog/2019/4/5/medical-education-medieval-style.

See also

 Domhnall Albanach Ó Troighthigh
Breviarium de signis, causis et curis morborum

External links
English text
Latin text
Editions reviews
Code of Health of the School of Salernum: Translated Into English Verse by John Ordronaux. Internet Archive online document

1480 books
12th-century Latin books
History of medieval medicine
Schola Medica Salernitana